"A Little Bit" is a song by Jessica Simpson from her 2001 album Irresistible, later covered by Rosie Ribbons.

A Little Bit may also refer to:

"A Little Bit" (Nina Åström song), the Finnish entry in the Eurovision Song Contest 2000
"A Little Bit" (Pandora song), a song by Pandora from her 1997 album Changes
"A Little Bit", a song by a-ha from their 2002 album Lifelines
"A Little Bit", a song by MYMP	from their 2003 album Soulful Acoustic

See also
"Give a Little Bit", a 1977 song by Supertramp
"Little Bit", a 2007 song by Lykke Li
Lil Bit (disambiguation)
"A Little Bit More", a 1973 song by Bobby Gosh